Polychlorinated dibenzofurans (PCDFs) are a family of organic compounds with one or several of the hydrogens in the dibenzofuran structure replaced by chlorines. For example, 2,3,7,8-tetrachlorodibenzofuran (TCDF) has chlorine atoms substituted for each of the hydrogens on the number 2, 3, 7, and 8 carbons (see structure in the upper left corner of the second image). Polychlorinated dibenzofurans with chlorines at least in positions 2,3,7 and 8 are much more toxic than the parent compound dibenzofurane, with properties and chemical structures similar to polychlorinated dibenzodioxins. These groups together are often inaccurately called dioxins. They are known developmental toxicants, and suspected human carcinogens. PCDFs tend to co-occur with polychlorinated dibenzodioxins (PCDDs). PCDFs can be formed by pyrolysis or incineration at temperatures below 1200 °C of chlorine containing products, such as PVC, PCBs, and other organochlorides, or of non-chlorine containing products in the presence of chlorine donors. Dibenzofurans are known persistent organic pollutants (POP), classified among the dirty dozen in the Stockholm Convention on Persistent Organic Pollutants.

Congeners

Safety, toxicity, regulation
Occupational exposure to PCDFs may occur through inhalation and contact with the skin, although intake even in workers at waste incineration plants are not particularly high. For general population the most important source is food of animal origin like with other dioxin-like compounds. The most relevant congener is 2,3,4,7,8-pentachlorodibenzofuran (2,3,4,7,8-PCDF) which is more toxic and based on relative toxicity more prevalent than other PCDFs.

See also 
 Dioxins and dioxin-like compounds
 Polychlorinated biphenyl

References

Further resources 
 Synopsis on dioxins and PCBs
 Chemical Profile: DIBENZOFURANS (CHLORINATED) 
 NPI Polychlorinated dioxins and furans fact sheet

Chloroarenes
Incineration
Immunotoxins
Dibenzofurans
Persistent organic pollutants under the Convention on Long-Range Transboundary Air Pollution
Persistent organic pollutants under the Stockholm Convention